John March may refer to:
 John March (colonel), businessman and colonel in the Massachusetts Bay militia
 John March (barrister), English barrister and legal writer
 John March (bishop), Canadian bishop

See also
 Jack March, American tennis player and promoter